Phidippus zethus is a species of jumping spider (Salticidae) native to Mexico.

References 

Salticidae
Spiders described in 2004
Spiders of Mexico